Myaing is a town and seat of Myaing Township in the Magway Region of central  Myanmar.

Transport 

It was connected to the Myanmar Railway network in 1998.

See also 

 Transport in Myanmar

References 

Township capitals of Myanmar
Populated places in Magway Region